Joker Fuel of Norway was a UCI Continental cycling team based in Norway,
 managed by Birger Hungerholdt with assistance from directeur sportifs Gino van Oudehove and Anders Linnestad. The team had well known riders, including Alexander Kristoff who rode for the team from 2007 to 2009, and Edvald Boasson Hagen who joined the team in 2006  and in his first season in the continental circuits he took eight wins including three stages of the Tour de l'Avenir.

The team folded in 2020 due to financial pressures of the COVID-19 pandemic.

Team roster

Major wins

2006
 Road Race Championships, Lars Petter Nordhaug
Stage 4 Rhône-Alpes Isère Tour, Edvald Boasson Hagen
Stages 1 & 5 Thüringen Rundfahrt der U23, Edvald Boasson Hagen
GP Möbel Alvisse, Gabriel Rasch
Stage 3 Flèche du Sud, Christopher Myhre
Overall Ringerike GP, Gabriel Rasch
Stage 3, Edvald Boasson Hagen
Scandinavian Open Road Race, Edvald Boasson Hagen
Stages 2, 5 & 7 Tour de l'Avenir, Edvald Boasson Hagen
2007
 Time Trial Championships, Edvald Boasson Hagen
 Road Race Championships, Alexander Kristoff
Overall Istrian Spring Trophy, Edvald Boasson Hagen
Prologue, Edvald Boasson Hagen
Stage 6 Tour de Normandie, Edvald Boasson Hagen
Overall Rhône-Alpes Isère Tour, Gabriel Rasch
Stage 3, Gabriel Rasch
Stages 1 & 6 Tour de Bretagne, Edvald Boasson Hagen
Overall Ringerike GP, Edvald Boasson Hagen
Stages 1, 2, 3 & 5, Edvald Boasson Hagen
Overall Paris–Corrèze, Edvald Boasson Hagen
Stages 1 & 2, Edvald Boasson Hagen
Stage 4 Tour of Ireland, Edvald Boasson Hagen
2008
Stage 7 Tour de Bretagne, Frederik Wilmann
Stage 2 Olympia's Tour, Joachim Bohler
Stage 3 Ringerike GP, Joachim Bohler
Stage 4 Ringerike GP, Alexander Kristoff
2009
Poreč Trophy, Ole Haavardsholm
Stage 6 Tour de Normandie, Lars Petter Nordhaug
Stage 3 Ringerike GP, Alexander Kristoff
Stage 4 Ringerike GP, Sondre Sortveit
Stage 5 Ringerike GP, Stian Remme
Stage 1 Tour Alsace, Frederik Wilmann
Overall Mi-Août Bretonne, Frederik Wilmann
Stage 3 Tour of Ireland, Lars Petter Nordhaug
2010
Overall Ringerike GP, Christer Rake
Stage 4, Christer Rake
2011
Rogaland GP, Frederik Wilmann
Stage 5 Tour of Norway, Christer Rake
Stage 2 Tour of China, Adrian Gjølberg
2012
 Time Trial Championships, Reidar Borgersen
2013
Stage 3 Circuit des Ardennes, Team time trial
Ringerike GP, Reidar Borgersen
Overall Ronde de l'Oise, Vegard Breen
Gooikse Pijl, Vegard Robinson Bugge
2014
 Time Trial Championships, Reidar Borgersen
Arno Wallaard Memorial, Edvin Wilson
Overall Okolo Jižních Čech, Reidar Borgersen
Stage 2 (ITT), Reidar Borgersen
Duo Normand, Reidar Borgersen & Truls Korsæth
2015
Stage 3 Tour de Normandie, Daniel Hoelgaard
Stage 5 Tour de Normandie, Bjørn Tore Hoem
Stage 1 Tour de Bretagne, Adrian Aas Stien
Stage 5 Tour de Bretagne, Daniel Hoelgaard
Stage 3 Ronde de l'Oise, Vegard Stake Laengen
Overall Tour Alsace, Vegard Stake Laengen
Stage 1, Bjørn Tore Hoem
Stage 3, Vegard Stake Laengen
2016
Overall Tour de Gironde, Amund Grøndahl Jansen
Stage 1, Truls Korsæth
Stage 2, Amund Grøndahl Jansen
Stage 3, Adrian Aas Stien
Grand Prix d'Isbergues, Kristoffer Halvorsen
Stages 3b & 4 Olympia's Tour, Kristoffer Halvorsen
UCI Under-23 World Road Race Championships, Kristoffer Halvorsen
2017
Handzame Classic, Kristoffer Halvorsen
Stage 1 Circuit des Ardennes, Markus Hoelgaard
 Road Race Championships, Rasmus Tiller
Stage 1 Tour Alsace, Markus Hoelgaard
Stage 3 Tour Alsace, Carl Fredrik Hagen
2018
Overall Tour du Jura, Carl Fredrik Hagen
Stage 1 Tour de Bretagne, Herman Dahl
Prologue Grand Prix Priessnitz spa, Rasmus Tiller
Overall Ronde de l'Oise, Henrik Evensen
Stages 1 & 4, Henrik Evensen
GP Horsens, Herman Dahl
2019
Stage 3 International Tour of Rhodes, Herman Dahl
Stage 4 Tour de Normandie, Ole Forfang
2020 
Stage 1 International Tour of Rhodes, Søren Wærenskjold

National Champions
2006
 Norway Road Race Championships, Lars Petter Nordhaug
2007
 Norway Time Trial Championships, Edvald Boasson Hagen
 Norway Race Championships, Alexander Kristoff
2012
 Norway Time Trial Championships, Reidar Borgersen
2014
 Norway Time Trial Championships, Reidar Borgersen
2017
 Norway Road Race Championships, Rasmus Tiller

References

External links
 

UCI Continental Teams (Europe)
Cycling teams based in Norway
Cycling teams established in 2005